Gaige Colburn Prim (born April 8, 1999) is an American professional basketball player for Ulsan Hyundai Mobis Phoebus of the Korean Basketball League (KBL). He previously played for West Texas A&M Buffaloes, South Plains Texans, and Missouri State Bears basketball.

High school career
Prim attended Grandview High School in Aurora, Colorado. As a junior, Prim averaged 14 points and eight rebounds per game. He was named to second team all-league and helped lead the team to the Colorado Sweet 16. Prim averaged 17 points, 10 rebounds and four blocks per game as a senior, shooting 70 percent from the field. He helped Grandview reach the Colorado Elite 8 and was a first-team all-league pick. Prim committed to playing college basketball for West Texas A&M.

College career
Prim averaged 10.5 points and 6.8 rebounds per game as a freshman at West Texas A&M. For his sophomore season, Prim transferred to South Plains College. He helped the Texans achieve an automatic berth in the NJCAA tournament after contributing a 27 point, 14 rebound game during a 73–71 win against Odessa College in the Region V championship game. As a sophomore, Prim averaged 20.7 points and 11.5 rebounds per game. He was named a NJCAA First Team All-American. Prim was one of the top junior college recruits and committed to transfer to Missouri State, choosing the Bears over UT Arlington.

Prim was plagued by an undisclosed leg injury during his junior season but averaged 13.7 points and 4.9 rebounds per game. He earned Third Team All-Missouri Valley Conference honors. On February 26, 2021, Prim scored a career-high 33 points in a 90–81 win against Evansville. As a senior, Prim averaged 16.7 points and 9.1 rebounds per game and tallied eight double-doubles. He was named to the First Team All-MVC. Prim opted to return for a fifth season of eligibility, granted by the NCAA due to the COVID-19 pandemic. He repeated on the First Team All-MVC.

Career statistics

College

NCAA Division I

|-
| style="text-align:left;"| 2019–20
| style="text-align:left;"| Missouri State
| 28 || 15 || 21.7 || .493 || .500 || .785 || 4.9 || 1.6 || .6 || .7 || 13.7
|-
| style="text-align:left;"| 2020–21
| style="text-align:left;"| Missouri State
| 24 || 24 || 29.4 || .599 || .000 || .734 || 9.1 || 3.0 || 1.2 || 1.3 || 16.7
|- class="sortbottom"
| style="text-align:center;" colspan="2"| Career
| 52 || 39 || 25.2 || .543 || .250 || .759 || 6.8 || 2.2 || .9 || 1.0 || 15.1

NCAA Division II

|-
| style="text-align:left;"| 2017–18
| style="text-align:left;"| West Texas A&M
| 36 || 8 || 18.0 || .539 || .000 || .770 || 6.8 || .6 || .5 || .8 || 10.5

JUCO

|-
| style="text-align:left;"| 2018–19
| style="text-align:left;"| South Plains
| 34 || 34 || 26.1 || .648 || .438 || .725 || 11.5 || 1.6 || 1.1 || 1.2 || 20.7

References

External links
Missouri State Bears bio
South Plains Texans bio
West Texas A&M Buffaloes bio

1999 births
Living people
American men's basketball players
Basketball players from Colorado
Missouri State Bears basketball players
Power forwards (basketball)
South Plains Texans basketball players
Sportspeople from Aurora, Colorado
West Texas A&M Buffaloes basketball players
Ulsan Hyundai Mobis Phoebus players
American expatriate basketball people in South Korea